FC Oka was a Russian football team from Kolomna, founded in 1923. It played professionally from 1989 to 1996. Their best result was 8th place in Zone 3 of the Russian Second Division in 1992. In 1997 it merged with FC Avangard-Kortek Kolomna to form FC Kolomna.

External links
  Team history at KLISF

Association football clubs established in 1923
Association football clubs disestablished in 1997
Defunct football clubs in Russia
Football in Moscow Oblast
1923 establishments in Russia
1997 disestablishments in Russia